The Chief Scout's Award or Chief Scout Award is a Scouting award issued by several national Scouting organizations:
 Chief Scout's Award (Scouts Canada)
 Chief Scout Award (Scouting Ireland) which replaced the
 Chief Scout's Award (Scouting Ireland) c.2011
 The Chief Scout's Bronze, Silver, Gold and Platinum Awards, part of the Scout Association's Award Scheme in the United Kingdom

Scout and Guide awards